WeeWorld was an online game and messaging website, originally created in 2002 with a company that was based in Glasgow, Scotland, with a few offices in London and Boston, as well as other cities in the USA. The company had created WeeWorld.com, formally known as a social networking site, to which was mostly geared towards teens and tweens. The website is also known for its brand of instant messaging and chat-based avatars, known as “WeeMees”, Which was also released on a variety of digital platforms and services. There were approximately 180 million WeeMees created worldwide, but the site was unexpectedly shut down, as of 11 May 2017. From then on, there has not been anymore information from WeeWorld or the company itself. It is said that the company could no longer profit off of WeeWorld, and the only option left was to sell it to the new owners, who had then decided to shut it down.

WeeMees

Description 
WeeMees are two-dimensional cartoon avatars that WeeWorld users are issued when first joining the community. Users can purchase virtual goods for their avatars, such as clothing, accessories, and food and drink items. As WeeWorld's target demographic is teenagers, many of the virtual goods reflect current pop culture and celebrity fashion trends.

Promotions and partnership
WeeWorld has partnered with corporations such as AOL, MSN and Skype. Through a partnership with RCA, it has promoted artists such as Alicia Keys and Avril Lavigne through virtual merchandise sales and WeeMees of the respective artists.  WeeWorld has also promoted artists such as the Jonas Brothers, Justin Timberlake, Jason Derulo, Raven-Symoné, the Pussycat Dolls, Justin Bieber, and Taylor Swift.

History 
The avatars were created in 2001 by Mike Kinsella and John McGuire, who also founded Saw-You.com, in Glasgow, Scotland. In 2003, Microsoft began offering the avatars for use to their Hotmail customers via the MSN chat service. The new service attracted 150,000 users during the first day of the avatars being launched, with the WeeMee website attracting 1.5 million hits daily. In 2004 the UK's largest social network, Friendsreunited.com, also introduced the WeeMee to their user base. In December 2008 the virtual technology firm DA agreed to develop a 3-D version of the avatar.

The company was run by Celia Francis and went into liquidation in 2014. It was then sold to Opinurate, who closed the website down in 2017. As of September 2020, the website (weeworld.com) is now listed as being for sale.

References

Companies established in 2000
Companies based in Glasgow
Entertainment companies of the United Kingdom
Internet properties disestablished in 2017
American social networking websites
Virtual world communities